Czerwona Woda  is a village in the administrative district of Gmina Węgliniec, within Zgorzelec County, Lower Silesian Voivodeship, in south-western Poland.

The village has a population of 2,000.

Notable residents
 Hans Rauch (1899 – 1958), Luftwaffe General

References

Villages in Zgorzelec County